Georgia Louise Jones (born 3 April 1990) is a British female professional basketball player.

External links
 Profile at eurobasket.com

1990 births
Living people
English women's basketball players
Shooting guards
Basketball players at the 2018 Commonwealth Games
Commonwealth Games medallists in basketball
Commonwealth Games silver medallists for England
Medallists at the 2018 Commonwealth Games
People from Trafford (district)
Sportspeople from Greater Manchester
English expatriate sportspeople in Romania
British expatriate basketball people
Expatriate basketball people in Romania